The 2021 Trafford Metropolitan Borough Council election to elect members of Trafford Metropolitan Borough Council in England took place on 6 May 2021. As with many other local elections in England, it was postponed from May 2020, due to the COVID-19 pandemic.

One third of council seats were contested in the election, with each successful candidate serving a two-year term of office rather than the normal four due to a boundary review to be implemented in 2023. Four additional seats were also contested in concurrent by-elections; seats which had become vacant due to deaths and resignations.

After the election, the composition of the council was:

Results

Summary

By ward
Asterisk denotes a incumbent councillor seeking re-election.

Altrincham ward

Ashton upon Mersey ward

Bowdon ward

Broadheath ward

Brooklands ward

Bucklow-St. Martins ward

Clifford ward

Davyhulme East ward

Davyhulme West ward

Flixton ward

Gorse Hill ward

Hale Barns ward

Hale Central ward

Longford ward

Priory ward

Sale Moor ward

St. Mary's ward

Stretford ward

Timperley ward

Urmston ward

Village ward

References

Trafford
2021
2020s in Greater Manchester
May 2021 events in the United Kingdom